The Women's 3 x 2.5 kilometre relay in cross-country skiing was held on 9 April 2011. The relay was open for skiers in classification category visual impairment, sitting, and standing. There were only two competing teams, but medals were awarded.

Results

See also
FIS Nordic World Ski Championships 2011 – Women's 4 × 5 kilometre relay

References

2011 IPC Biathlon and Cross-Country Skiing World Championships Live results, and schedule at ipclive.siwidata.com
WCH - Khanty Mansiysk - Results - Cross-Country Relay, IPC Nordic Skiing

Relay